Lieutenant-Colonel John Francis Granville Scrope Egerton, 4th Earl of Ellesmere, MVO, K.StJ (14 November 1872 – 24 August 1944) was a British peer and soldier from the Egerton family, known as Viscount Brackley before 1914.

Early life and background
Lord Brackley was the eldest son of the 3rd Earl of Ellesmere and his wife, Lady Katherine Phipps.

Military career
Lord Brackley was appointed a captain in the part-time 3rd (Edinburgh Light Infantry Militia) Battalion, Royal Scots, on 10 March 1894. The battalion was embodied in December 1899, and in early March 1900 left Queenstown on the SS Oriental for South Africa to serve in the Boer War. Lord Brackley and most of the battalion left Cape Town for the United Kingdom in early May 1902, shortly before the end of the war. After his return, he was appointed Aide-de-camp to Sir William Knox, Commander, Royal Artillery, for 3rd Army Corps. His battalion later became the 3rd (Reserve) Battalion, Royal Scots, in the Special Reserve and he was promoted to its command as lieutenant-colonel on 11 November 1912. He was in command when it was embodied at the outbreak of World War I and served with it during the war, when he was mentioned in despatches.

Family
On 28 October 1905, he married Lady Violet Lambton (the eldest daughter of the 4th Earl of Durham) and they had seven children:

Lady Anne Katherine Egerton (1908–1964), married Geoffrey Babington
Lady Jane Mary Egerton (1909–1978), married Richard Scrope
Lady Mary Egerton (born 1911), married Lt-Col. Conyers Scrope
Lady Susan Alice Egerton (1913–2010), married Maj. John Askew
John Sutherland Egerton (1915–2000)
Lady Margaret Egerton (1918–2004), married Sir Jock Colville
Lady Alice Egerton (1923–1977)

Lord Brackley inherited his father's titles in 1914. He sold his father's seat, St George's Hill House and its 964-acre estate, to master builder W. G. Tarrant, who went on to create Surrey's landmark St George's Hill estate. The new Earl then bought Hatchford End on the family's former estate at Hatchford Park for his unmarried sisters (Lady Mabel Egerton, Lady Alice Egerton and Lady Leila Egerton). He and Lady Violet moved to Burwood House in Surrey, now Notre Dame School.

On his own death in 1944, he was succeeded by his only son, John.

Cricket
A cricketer, he captained his own side to the West Indies in the winter of 1904–05.

References

External links
CricketArchive: Lord Brackley

1872 births
1944 deaths
Earls in the Peerage of the United Kingdom
Royal Scots officers
British Army personnel of the Second Boer War
British Army personnel of World War I
Knights of Justice of the Order of St John
Members of the Royal Victorian Order
English cricketers
Marylebone Cricket Club cricketers
John
John
Presidents of the Marylebone Cricket Club
Lord Brackley's XI cricketers